Last.fm Limited is a music website founded in the United Kingdom in 2002. Using a music recommender system called "Audioscrobbler", Last.fm builds a detailed profile of each user's musical taste by recording details of the tracks the user listens to, either from Internet radio stations, or the user's computer or many portable music devices. This information is transferred ("scrobbled") to Last.fm's database either via the music player (including, among others, Spotify, Deezer, Tidal, MusicBee, SoundCloud, and Anghami) or via a plug-in installed into the user's music player. The data is then displayed on the user's profile page and compiled to create reference pages for individual artists.

On 30 May 2007, it was acquired by CBS Corporation via its streaming division CBS Interactive, today a part of Paramount Global, for £140 million (US$280 million).

The site formerly offered a radio streaming service, which was discontinued on 28 April 2014. The ability to access the large catalogue of music stored on the site was later removed entirely, replaced by links to YouTube and Spotify where available.

History

The current Last.fm website was developed from two separate sources, Last.fm and Audioscrobbler, which were merged in 2005. Audioscrobbler began as a computer science project of Richard Jones when he attended the University of Southampton School of Electronics and Computer Science in the United Kingdom, with the term scrobbling defined as the finding, processing, and distribution of information involving people, music, and other data. Jones developed the first plugins, and then opened an API to the community, after which many music players on different operating system platforms were supported. Audioscrobbler was limited to keeping track of which songs its users played on a registered computer, which allowed for charting and collaborative filtering.

Audioscrobbler and Last.fm (2002–2006)
Last.fm was founded in 2002 by Felix Miller, Martin Stiksel, Michael Breidenbruecker and Thomas Willomitzer, all of them from Germany or Austria, as an Internet radio station and music community site, using similar music profiles to generate dynamic playlists. The site name takes advantage of a domain hack using .fm, the top level domain of Micronesia, popular with FM radio related sites. The "love" and "ban" buttons allowed users to gradually customise their profiles. Last.fm won the Europrix 2002 and was nominated for the Prix Ars Electronica in 2003.

The Audioscrobbler and Last.fm teams began to work closely together, both teams moving into the same offices in Whitechapel, London, and by 2003 Last.fm was fully integrated with Audioscrobbler profiles. Input could come through an Audioscrobbler plugin or a Last.fm station. The sites also shared many community forums, although a few were unique to each site. The old Audioscrobbler site at the audioscrobbler.com domain name was wholly merged into the new Last.fm site on 9 August 2005. Audioscrobbler.net was launched as a separate development-oriented site on 5 September 2005. However, at the very bottom of each of the Last.fm pages there was an Audioscrobbler "slogan", which changes each time the page is refreshed. Based on well-known sayings or advertisements, these originally appeared at the top of the Audioscrobbler website pages and were all created and contributed by the original site members.

An update to the site was made on 14 July 2006, which included a new software application for playing Last.fm radio streams and for logging of tracks played with other media players. Other changes included the improvement of the friends system and updating it to require a two-way friendship, the addition of the Last.fm "Dashboard" where users can see on one page relevant information for their profile, expanded options for purchasing music from online retailers and a new visual design for the web site (including an optional black colour scheme).  The site began expanding its language base on 15 July 2006, with a Japanese version. Currently, the site is available in German, Spanish, French, Italian, Polish, Portuguese, Swedish, Russian, Turkish and Simplified Chinese. In late 2006, the site won Best Community Music Site at the BT Digital Music Awards in October. Last.fm also teamed with EMI on Tuneglue-Audiomap. In January 2007 it was nominated for Best Website at the NME Awards.

CBS Acquisition and redesign (2007–2009)
At the end of April 2007, rumours of negotiations between CBS and Last.fm emerged, suggesting that CBS intended to purchase Last.fm for about £225 million ($449 million). In May 2007 it was announced that Channel 4 Radio was to broadcast a weekly show called Worldwide Chart reflecting what Last.fm users around the world were listening to. On 30 May 2007, it was announced that Last.fm had been bought by CBS for £140 million with Last.fm's current management team staying in place. In July 2008, the "new generation" Last.fm was launched featuring a completely new layout, color scheme, and several new features, as well as some old ones removed. This was, however, met with dissatisfaction amongst some users, who complained about the "ugly and non-user-friendly layout", bugs, and slowness. Still, a month after the redesign a CBS press release credited the redesign with generating a 20% growth in the site's traffic.

On 22 February 2009, Techcrunch claimed that "[the] RIAA asked social music service Last.fm for data about its users' listening habits to find people with unreleased tracks on their computers. And Last.fm, which is owned by CBS, allegedly handed the data over to the RIAA." This led to several public postings from both Last.fm and Techcrunch, with Last.fm denying passing any personal data to RIAA. The request was purportedly prompted by the leak of U2's then-unreleased album No Line On The Horizon, and its subsequent widespread distribution via peer-to-peer file sharing services such as BitTorrent.

Three months later, on 22 May 2009, Techcrunch claimed that it was CBS, the parent company of Last.fm, that handed over the data. Last.fm again denied that this was the case, saying that CBS could not have handed over the data without Last.fm's knowledge.

Changes to streaming and access on other platforms (2009–2011)
On 24 March 2009, Last.fm announced a change in free stream listening policy. According to the blog post "[...] In the United States, United Kingdom and Germany, nothing will change. In all other countries, listening to Last.fm Radio will soon require a subscription of €3.00 per month." The change went into effect on 22 April 2009. The announcement led to a wave of disappointment among users, resulting in users stopping submission of their data, refusing to change signatures/avatars and even deleting their accounts.

On 11 September 2009, CBS Radio announced that Last.fm programming would be available in four major market FM stations for the first time on their HD Radio multicasts. This includes KCBS-HD2 in Los Angeles; KITS-HD3 in San Francisco; WWFS-HD2 in New York City; and WXRT-HD3 in Chicago. The programming, which consisted mostly of music aggregated by Last.fm's user-generated weekly music charts as well as live performances and interviews from the Last.fm studios in New York City, debuted on 5 October.

On 12 April 2010, Last.fm announced that they would be removing the option to preview entire tracks, instead redirecting to sites such as the free Hype Machine and pay-to-listen MOG for this purpose. This provoked a large negative reaction from some in the Last.fm user community who perceived the removal as hindering the ability of lesser-known and unsigned artists to gain exposure for their music and general enjoyment of the site. A new "Play direct from artist" feature was introduced soon after, which allowed artists to select individual tracks for users to be able to stream in full.

The ability to listen to custom radio stations ("personal tag radio", "loved tracks radio") was withdrawn on 17 November 2010. This change provoked an angry response among users. Last.fm stated that the move was for licensing reasons. The change meant that a tag radio stream would include all music tagged as such, not just that tagged by each individual user, effectively widening the number of tracks that might be streamed under any one tag set.

Website and desktop application redesigns (2012–2013)

In March 2012, Last.fm was breached by hackers and more than 43 million user accounts were compromised. The full extent of the hack, and its connection to similar attacks against Tumblr, LinkedIn and Myspace in the same time frame, were not confirmed until August 2016. The passwords were encrypted using an outdated, unsalted MD5 hash. Last.fm made users aware of the attack in June 2012.

On 14 February 2012, Last.fm announced that a new beta desktop client had been launched for public testing. The new scrobbler was released for all users on 15 January 2013.

On 12 July 2012, Last.fm announced a new website redesign was also open to public beta and would rely on feedback from testing users. The site redesign went live for all users on 2 August 2012. While well received by technology websites, some of the site's users reacted negatively to the changes on the website's forum.

On 19 June 2012, Last.fm launched Last.fm Originals, a new website featuring exclusive performances and interviews from various musical artists.

On 13 December 2012, it was announced that Last.fm would discontinue radio service after January 2013 to subscribers in all countries except the United States, United Kingdom, Germany, Canada, Ireland, Australia, New Zealand and Brazil. Additionally, radio in the desktop client would require a subscription in the US, UK and Germany, although the website radio would remain free in those countries.

End of radio streaming and redesign (2014–present)
In January 2014, the website announced on-demand integration with Spotify and a new YouTube-powered radio player. Upon the introduction of the YouTube player, the standard radio service became a subscriber-only feature.

On 26 March 2014, Last.fm announced they would be discontinuing their streaming radio service on 28 April 2014. In a statement, the site said the decision was made in order to "focus on improving scrobbling and recommendations".

On 15 April 2015, Last.fm released a subscriber-exclusive beta of a new website redesign. Digital Spy described user reactions on the site's forums during the week of the redesign as "universally negative".

In 2016, Music Manager was discontinued and music uploaded to the site by musicians and record labels became inaccessible; post-Spotify integration they could still be played and downloaded where the option was given, but following the change artists themselves were unable to access their songs in the Last.fm catalogue.

The website experienced a slight revival during the COVID-19 pandemic beginning in 2020, tied to its popularity within music communities on the communication platform Discord. Last.fm celebrated its twentieth anniversary in 2022. Third-party developers have built programs that integrate users' listening statistical data with Discord, including a popular bot from the Netherlands which has over 400,000 total users.

Funding and staff
Last.fm Ltd is funded from the sale of online advertising space and monthly user subscriptions.

Funding prior to acquisition
In 2004, the company received the first round of angel money, from Peter Gardner, an investment banker who was introduced to the founders as early as 2002. A second round was led by Stefan Glaenzer (joined by Joi Ito and Reid Hoffman), who bought into Michael Breidenbruecker's shares as well. In 2006 the company received the first round of venture capital funding from European investors Index Ventures, whose General Partners Neil Rimer and Danny Rimer also joined Last.fm's board of directors, consisting of Felix Miller, Martin Stiksel and Stefan Glaenzer (chair).

Original founders Felix Miller, Martin Stiksel and Richard Jones left the company in summer 2009.

Features

User accounts
The free user account includes access to all the main features listed below. Registered Users are also able to send and receive private messages.
The newly launched last fm pro user account adds additional features to the free tier, most notable being the ability to change username and early access to new features.

Profile
A Last.fm user can build a musical profile using any or all of several methods: by listening to their personal music collection on a music player application on a computer or an iPod with an Audioscrobbler plugin, or by listening to the Last.fm Internet radio service, either with the Last.fm client, or with the embedded player. All songs played are added to a log from which personal top artist/track bar charts and musical recommendations are calculated. This automatic track logging is called scrobbling.

Last.fm automatically generates a profile page for every user which includes basic information such as their user name, avatar, date of registration and the total number of tracks played. There is also a Shoutbox for public messages. Profile pages are visible to all, together with a list of top artists and tracks, and the 10 most recently played tracks (can be expanded). Each user's profile has a 'Taste-o-Meter' which gives a rating of how compatible the user's music taste is.

Recommendations
Last.fm features a personal recommendations page that is only visible to the user concerned and lists suggested new music and events, all tailored to the user's own preferences. Recommendations are calculated using a collaborative filtering algorithm so users can browse and hear previews of a list of artists not listed on their own profiles but which appear on those of others with similar musical tastes.

Artist pages

Once an artist has had a track or tracks "scrobbled" by at least one user, Last.fm automatically generates a main artist page. This page shows details of the total number of plays, the total number of listeners, the most popular weekly and overall tracks, the top weekly listeners, a list of similar artists, most popular tags and a shoutbox for messages. There are also links to events, additional album and individual track pages and similar artists radio. Official music videos and other videos imported from YouTube may also be viewed on the relevant artist and track pages.

Users may add relevant biographical details and other information to any artist's main page in the form of a wiki. Edits are regularly moderated to prevent vandalism. A photograph of the artist may also be added. If more than one is submitted, the most popular one is chosen by public vote. User submitted content is licensed for use under the Creative Commons Attribution Share-Alike License and GNU Free Documentation License.

Last.fm currently cannot disambiguate artists with the same name; a single artist profile is shared between valid artists with the same name. Also Last.fm and its users currently do not differentiate between the Composer and the Artist of music which serves for confusion in classical music genres.

Charts

One particular feature of Last.fm is the semi-automatic weekly generation and archiving of detailed personal music charts and statistics which are created as part of its profile building. Users have several different charts available, including Top Artists, Top Tracks, and Top Albums. Each of these charts is based on the actual number of people listening to the track, album or artist recorded either through an Audioscrobbler plugin or the Last.fm radio stream.

Additionally, charts are available for the top tracks by each artist in the Last.fm system as well as the top tracks for individual albums (when the tagging information of the audio file is available). Artist profiles also keep track of a short list of Top Fans, which is calculated by a formula meant to portray the importance of an artist in a fan's own profile, balancing out users who play hundreds of tracks overall versus those who play only a few.

As the information generated is largely compiled from the ID3 data from audio files "scrobbled" from users' own computers, and which may be incorrect or misspelled, there are many errors in the listings. Tracks with ambiguous punctuation are especially prone to separate listings, which can dilute the apparent popularity of a track. Artists or bands with the same name are not always differentiated. The system attempts to translate some different artist tags to a single artist profile, and has recently attempted to harmonise track names.

Global charts

Last.fm generates weekly "global" charts of the top 400 artists and tracks listened to by all Last.fm users.

The result is notably different from traditional commercial music charts provided by the UK Top 40, Billboard, Soundscan and others, which are based on radio plays or sales. Last.fm charts are less volatile and a new album's release may be reflected in play data for many months or years after it drops out of commercial charts. For example, The Beatles have consistently been a top-five band at Last.fm, reflecting the continued popularity of the band's music irrespective of current album sales. Significant events, such as the release of a highly anticipated album or the death of an artist can have a large impact on the charts.

The Global Tag Chart shows the 100 most popular tags that have been used to describe artists, albums, and tracks. This is based on the total number of times the tag has been applied by Last.fm users since the tagging system was first introduced and does not necessarily reflect the number of users currently listening to any of the related "global tag radio" stations.

Radio stations
Last.fm previously offered customized virtual "radio stations" consisting of uninterrupted audio streams of individual tracks selected from the music files in the music library. This service was discontinued 28 April 2014.

Stations can be based on the user's personal profile, the user's "musical neighbours", or the user's "friends". Tags also have radio stations if enough music has the same tag. Radio stations can also be created on the fly, and each artist page allows selection of a "similar artists" or "artist fan" radio station. As of May 2009, Last.fm introduced Visual Radio, an improved version of Last.fm radio. This brought features such as an artist slideshow and combo stations, which allows for listening to stations consisting of common similar artists of up to either 3 artists or 3 tags.

Under the terms of the station's "radio" license, listeners may not select specific tracks (except as previews), or choose the order in which they are played, although any of the tracks played may be skipped or banned completely. The appropriate royalties are paid to the copyright holders of all streamed audio tracks according to the law in the UK. The radio stream uses an MP3 stream encoded at 128 kbit/s 44.1 kHz, which may be played using the in-page Flash player or the downloaded Last.fm client, but other community-supported players are available as well as a proxy which allows using a media player of choice.

On 24 March 2009, Last.fm announced that Last.fm Radio would require a subscription of €3.00 per month for users living outside the US, the UK, and Germany. This change was to take effect on 30 March, but was postponed until 22 April. The decision resulted in over 1,000 comments, most of them negative, on the Last.fm blog.

Streaming and radio services were discontinued by Last.fm on 28 April 2014, in order to "focus on its core product, the scrobbling experience". However, the website continues to generate recommendations based on a user's existing library.

Player

An "in-page" player is provided automatically for all listeners with HTML5-enabled browser or Adobe Flash installed on their computers. However, it is necessary to download and install the Last.fm client if a user also wishes information about played tracks from their own digital music collection to be included in their personal music profile.

Prior to August 2005, Last.fm generated an open stream that could be played in the user's music player of choice, with a browser-based player control panel. This proved difficult to support and has been officially discontinued. The Last.fm client is currently the only officially supported music player for playing customized Last.fm radio streams on desktop computers. The current version combines the functions of the music player with the plugin that transmits all track data to the Last.fm server, and effectively replaces the separate Last.fm Player and the standalone track submission plugins. It is also free software licensed under the GNU General Public License and available for Linux, Mac OS X and Microsoft Windows operating systems.

The player allows the user to enter the name of any artist or tag, which then gives a choice of a number of similar artist stations, or similar global tag stations. Alternatively, Recommendation radio or any of the user's personal radio stations may be played without the necessity to visit the website.

The player displays the name of the station and track currently playing, the song artist, title and track length as well as album details, the artist's photo and biographical details, album cover art when available, lists of similar artists and the most popular tags and top fans. There are several buttons, allowing the user to love, skip, or ban a song. The love button adds the song to the user's loved tracks list; the ban button ensures that the song will not be played again. Both features affect the user's profile. The skip button does not. Other buttons allow the user to tag or recommend the currently playing track. Other features offered by the application are: minor editing of the user's profile including removing recently played artists and songs from the loved, banned, or previously played track lists; lists of friends and neighbours, lists of tags and a list of previously played radio stations. Users can also open their full Last.fm profile page directly from the player.

The client also enables the user to install player plugins, these integrate with various standalone media players to allow the submission of tracks played in those programs.

In the latest version of the Last.fm Player application, the user can select to use an external player. When this is done, the Last.fm Player provides the user with a local URL, through which the Last.fm music stream is proxied. Users can then open the URL in their preferred media player.

A new version of the desktop client, which had been in beta since early 2012, was released on 15 January 2013. This version disabled the radio function for free users. To access that feature, a paid subscription is necessary.

Last.fm has also developed client software for mobile phones running the iPhone OS, BlackBerry OS and the Android OS. Last.fm has only released these apps in the United States, United Kingdom and Germany, claiming for four years that they are negotiating licenses for making the streaming available in other countries.

Last.fm remained out of service for more than 22 hours on 10 June 2014. It was amongst the longest outages the company has faced. The company, however, remained in contact with visitors using a status page.

Scrobbling
In addition to Last.fm automatically tracking music played via Last.fm's radio, users can also contribute (scrobble) listening data to their Last.fm profile from other streaming sites or by tracking music played locally on their own personal devices. Scrobbling is possible with music stored and played locally via software on devices such as PCs, mobile phones, tablets, and standalone (hardware) media players. Indeed, these were the only methods of scrobbling listening data both before and after the existence of the Last.fm radio service. Certain sites and media players have the ability to upload (scrobble) listening data built-in, for others users must download and install a plugin for their music player, which will automatically submit the artist and title of the song after either half the song or the first four minutes have played, whichever comes first. When the track is shorter than 30 seconds (31 seconds in iTunes) or the track lacks metadata (ID3, CDDB, etc.), the track is not submitted. To accommodate dial-up users or those listening to music while offline, caching of the data and submitting it in bulk is also possible.

List of supported media players and streaming sites 

The following services support sending service-specific recently played track feeds:
Rhobbler for Rhapsody (beta)

Other third party applications

Supported applications
Build Last.fm
As of March 2008, the website has added a section titled "Build" where third-party applications can be submitted for review, and then posted to the page.

SXSW Band-Aid
Last.fm partnered up with the SXSW festival by creating an application embedded in the corresponding group page that filters the various artists at the festival by a user's listening statistics, and then uses Last.fm's recommendation service to also suggest other performing artists that said user has not listened to.

Other applications

QuietScrob is a background scrobbler for iPhone, iPod Touch and iPad
iScrob is a full realtime backgrounding Scrobbler for iPhone and iPod Touch
Pocket Scrobbler for Windows Mobile enables scrobbling from supported media players as well as streaming radio from Last.fm
LastFmLib.net (LGPL) for using the Last.fm web services in VB.Net/C#
Last.fm Java bindings (BSD) for using the Last.fm web services in Java
Last.fm recent tracks widget for Mac OS X displays a user's most recently played tracks.
Last.fm widget for Opera also displays a user's most recently played tracks, but works on all platforms Opera runs on.
Last.fm dashboard widget for Mac OS X displays a user's last messages in his/her shoutbox.
last.tweet widget for Mac OS X displays the cover art of the recently played track, with Twitter integration.
FoxyTunes Firefox extension places Last.fm player controls and current song information on the browser status bar.
4u2Stream can play Last.fm content on UPnP equipped players.
ExitAhead finds music on eBay matching a Last.fm profile.
Last-Stats shows a user's stats and creates dynamic profile/chart images based on a user's Last.fm profile.
The Hype Machine can scrobble songs the user is listening to on the Hype Machine web-site.
SongStory is an App for the iPhone, which shows useful information about the currently playing track.
Tastebuds.fm is a free music-oriented dating site that imports a user's profile from Last.fm.
Web Scrobbler is a browser plugin with wide community support that offers scrobbling for many web based player applications, including the ability to favorite tracks and edit scrobble information.

See also
List of Internet radio stations
List of online music databases

References

External links

 – official site
Audioscrobbler development site
The Old Last.fm
Free Last.fm Music Streamer Plugin for Chrome 
Tiny webcaster Last.fm causes major online splash, Rockbites, 22 July 2003
Last.fm: Music to Listeners' Ears, Wired, 7 July 2003
The Musical Myware, Audio presentation by CEO Felix Miller, IT Conversations, 7 March 2006
Guardian Unlimited Interview, Guardian Unlimited Interview with Last.fm co-founder, Martin Stiksel, 4 November 2006
The Celestial Jukebox, New Statesman on the story of Last.fm, June 2009
Last.fm music charts widget
Last.fm for PC alternative download
Last.fm Down-Time Monitoring Tool

2002 establishments in the United Kingdom
Android (operating system) software
BlackBerry software
CBS Interactive websites
Domain hacks
Online music stores of the United Kingdom
Internet properties established in 2002
Internet radio in the United Kingdom
IOS software
Online music and lyrics databases
Recommender systems
Social cataloging applications
Software that uses Qt
Windows Phone software
2007 mergers and acquisitions